The Atlantic Council is an American think tank in the field of international affairs, favoring Atlanticism, founded in 1961. It manages sixteen regional centers and functional programs related to international security and global economic prosperity. It is headquartered in Washington, D.C. It is a member of the Atlantic Treaty Association.

History
The Atlantic Council was founded with the stated mission to encourage the continuation of cooperation between North America and Europe that began after World War II. In its early years, its work consisted largely of publishing policy papers and polling Europeans and Americans about their attitudes towards transatlantic and international cooperation. In these early years, its primary focus was on economic issues—mainly encouraging free trade between the two continents, and to a lesser extent to the rest of the world—but it also did some work on political and environmental issues.

Although the Atlantic Council did publish policy papers and monographs, Melvin Small of Wayne State University wrote that, especially in its early years, the Council's real strength lay in its connections to influential policymakers. The Council early on found a niche as "center for informal get-togethers" of leaders from both sides of the Atlantic, with members working to develop "networks of continuing communication".

The Atlantic Council also works outside Europe and the U.S. It was among the first organizations advocating an increased Japanese presence in the international community. Its Asian programs have expanded since 2001 as a consequence of the war in Afghanistan leading to the opening of its South Asia Center and Program on Asia. Climate change, and coordinating with India and China on these issues, were also a factor in this development.

In February 2009, James L. Jones, then-chairman of the Atlantic Council, stepped down in order to serve as President Obama's new National Security Advisor and was succeeded by Senator Chuck Hagel. In addition, other Council members also left to serve the administration: Susan Rice as ambassador to the UN, Richard Holbrooke as the Special Representative to Afghanistan and Pakistan, General Eric K. Shinseki as the Secretary of Veterans Affairs, and Anne-Marie Slaughter as Director of Policy Planning at the State Department. Four years later, Hagel stepped down to serve as US Secretary of Defense. Gen. Brent Scowcroft served as interim chairman of the organization's Board of Directors until January 2014, when former ambassador to China and governor of Utah Jon Huntsman Jr. was appointed.

In 2017, Tom Bossert, previously a Nonresident Zurich Cyber Risk Fellow at the Atlantic Council's Cyber Security Initiative, was appointed Homeland Security Advisor to the Trump administration.

The Digital Forensic Research Lab was founded in 2016, to study disinformation in open source environments and report on democratic processes. The leading donors  of the project and the think tank, in general, are currently Facebook, after a 2018 sum was donated, and the government of Great Britain.

In 2019, the Atlantic Council entered into a partnership with the Hungary Foundation, a group funded by the authoritarian Orbán government in Hungary. A series of strategy discussions was planned which would have included key US and Central Europe officials. In a meeting in Budapest that year, Atlantic Council members criticized Hungarian Foreign Ministry officials for limiting discussion of the state of democracy in Hungary. Following this, the Hungary Foundation canceled the project. In 2020, the Atlantic Council returned a grant from the Hungary Foundation and ended its relationship with the foundation.

Connections and funding
The Atlantic Council has, since its inception, stated it is a nonpartisan institution, with members "from the moderate internationalist wings of both parties" in the United States. Despite its connections, the Council is by charter independent of the U.S. government and NATO, a registered 501(c)(3) nonprofit organization.

In September 2014, Eric Lipton reported in The New York Times that since 2008, the US organization had received donations from more than twenty-five foreign governments. He wrote that the Atlantic Council was one of a number of think tanks that received substantial overseas funds and conducted activities that "typically align with the foreign governments’ agendas".

The Atlantic Council's Rafik Hariri Center for the Middle East was established with a donation from Bahaa Hariri and its founding head was Michele Dunne. After Mohamed Morsi was removed as President of Egypt by the military in 2013, Dunne urged the United States to suspend military aid to Egypt and called Morsi’s removal a "military coup". Bahaa Hariri complained to the Atlantic Council about Dunne's actions and four months later Dunne resigned her position.

In 2014, The Atlantic Council produced a report promoting the Transatlantic Trade and Investment Partnership (TTIP) — a proposed trade-accommodation agreement between the European Union and the U.S. — with the financial backing of FedEx, who were simultaneously lobbying Congress directly to decrease transatlantic tariffs.

In 2015 and 2016, the three largest donors, giving over $1 million USD each, were US millionaire Adrienne Arsht (executive vice chair), Lebanese billionaire Bahaa Hariri (estranged brother of Lebanese Prime Minister Saad Hariri), and the United Arab Emirates. The Ukrainian oligarch-run Burisma Holdings donated $100,000 per year for three years to the Atlantic Council starting in 2016. The full list of financial sponsors includes many military, financial, and corporate concerns.

The leading donors in 2018 were Facebook and the British government. According to the Council, of its 2019 revenue, 14% (approximately $5.5 million) came from government donors excluding the US government.

In 2021, the founding donor was Adrienne Arsht, and donors giving more than $1 million were the American Securities Foundation, Bahaa Hariri, Embassy of the United Arab Emirates, Facebook, Goldman Sachs, The Rockefeller Foundation, and the UK Foreign, Commonwealth and Development Office.

Events
The Atlantic Council creates a meeting place for heads of state, military leaders, and international leaders from both sides of the Atlantic. In 2009, the Council hosted former NATO Secretary General Anders Fogh Rasmussen's first major U.S. speech, in which he discussed issues such as NATO's mission in the War in Afghanistan, NATO cooperation with Russia, and the broader transatlantic relationship. Members of the U.S. Congress have also appeared, including Senator Richard Lugar and Secretary of State John Kerry.  The Council hosts events with sitting heads of state and government, including former Georgian President Mikheil Saakashvili, Ukrainian Prime Minister Arseniy Yatsenyuk, and former Latvian President Vaira Vīķe-Freiberga.

Since January 2007, the Council has hosted military leaders from both sides of the Atlantic. The council's Brent Scowcroft Center on International Security has, held periodic events known as the Commanders Series, where it invites military leaders from the United States and Europe to speak about conflicts of interest to the Atlantic community.  As part of the Commanders Series, American military leaders such as former General George Casey and former Admiral Timothy Keating and European leaders like former French Chief of Defense General Jean-Louis Georgelin and Dutch Lieutenant General Ton van Loon have spoken on issues such as the Iraq War, the war in Afghanistan, and security threats in Asia and Africa.

Its annual events include the Distinguished Leadership Awards in Washington, DC; the Future Leaders Summit; the Wroclaw Global Forum in Wroclaw, Poland; the Atlantic Council Energy & Economic Summit in Istanbul, Turkey; and the Global Citizen Awards in New York City.

On February 22, 2019, the Atlantic Council released its Declaration of Principles at the Munich Security Conference. Frederick Kempe, President and CEO of the Atlantic Council, said it was "an effort to rally and reinvigorate 'free peoples' around the world".

Programs and centers

The Atlantic Council's programs and subdivisions include:

 Young Atlanticist Network
 Program on Transatlantic Relations
 Brent Scowcroft Center on International Security
 GeoEconomics Center
 Freedom and Prosperity Center
 South Asia Center
 Energy and Environment 
 Eurasia Center 
 Africa Center
 Rafik Hariri Center for the Middle East and Middle East programs
 Adrienne Arsht Latin America Center
 Adrienne Arsht Center for Resilience
 Digital Forensic Research Lab

Leadership 

 John F.W. Rogers, Chairman
 David McCormick, Chairman, International Advisory Board
 Frederick Kempe, President and CEO
 James L. Jones, Jr., Executive Chairman Emeritus
 Damon Wilson, Executive Vice President
 Adrienne Arsht, Executive Vice Chair 
 Stephen J. Hadley, Executive Vice Chair
 Robert J. Abernethy, Vice Chair (Executive Committee) 
 Richard Edelman, Vice Chair (Executive Committee) 
 C. Boyden Gray, Vice Chair (Executive Committee)
 Alexander Mirtchev, Vice Chair (Executive Committee) 
 John Studzinski, Vice Chair (Executive Committee)
 Jason Healey, Director, Cyber Statecraft Initiative
 Peter Schechter, Director, Adrienne Arsht Latin America Center
 Rama Yade, Director, Africa Center
 John E. Herbst, Director, Dinu Patriciu Eurasia Center
 David Koranyi, Director, Eurasian Energy Futures Initiative, Dinu Patriciu Eurasia Center
 Mathew Burrows, Director, Foresight, Strategy, and Risks Initiative

Notable directors

Stéphane Abrial 
Peter Ackerman (Executive Committee member)
Timothy D. Adams
Barbara Barrett
Colleen Bell
Stephen Biegun
Philip M. Breedlove
Esther Brimmer (Executive Committee member)
R. Nicholas Burns
Richard R. Burt (Executive Committee member) 
Teresa Carlson
James E. Cartwright
Michael Chertoff
Wesley K. Clark
Ralph D. Crosby Jr.
Paula J. Dobriansky (Executive Committee member)
Joseph F. Dunford, Jr.
Stuart E. Eizenstat
Mark T. Esper
Jendayi E. Frazer
Sherri W. Goodman (Executive Committee member)
Michael V. Hayden
Tim Holt
Wolfgang Ischinger
Deborah Lee James
Henry A. Kissinger KCMG
Douglas Lute
Jane Holl Lute
William J. Lynn
Mark Machin
John M. McHugh
Judith A. Miller (Executive Committee member) 
Dariusz Mioduski
Michael Morell
Richard L. Morningstar
Georgette Mosbacher
Dambisa F. Moyo
Thomas R. Nides
Joseph S. Nye
Ana Palacio
David H. Petraeus
Daniel B. Poneman
Thomas J. Ridge
Lawrence Di Rita
Charles O. Rossotti
Curtis Michael Scaparrotti
Rajiv Shah
Ali Jehangir Siddiqui
Walter Slocombe
Clifford Sobel
James Stavridis
Michael S. Steele
Frances M. Townsend (Executive Committee member)
Melanne Verveer
Charles F. Wald
Michael F. Walsh
Ronald Weiser
Neal S. Wolin
Jenny Wood (Executive Committee member)
Mary C. Yates
Dov S. Zakheim
Irfan Nooruddin

Honorary directors

 James A. Baker, III
 Ashton B. Carter
 Robert M. Gates
 James N. Mattis 
 Michael G. Mullen
 Leon E. Panetta
 William J. Perry 
 Colin L. Powell
 Condoleezza Rice
 William H. Webster

Lifetime directors

Julia Chang Bloch
Bantz John Craddock
Brian Dailey
Kenneth W. Dam
Chris Dodd
Julie Finley
Chas W. Freeman
Carlton W. Fulford Jr.
Edmund P. Giambastiani Jr.
Barbara Hackman Franklin
Robert Hormats
George A. Joulwan
Roger Kirk
Philip Lader
Henrik Liljegren
John D. Macomber
James P. McCarthy
George E. Moose
Hilda Ochoa-Brillembourg
Thomas R. Pickering
Joseph W. Ralston
Marjorie Scardino
William H. Taft IV
Kiron Skinner
Paula Stern
Carl E. Vuono
J. Robinson West
R. James Woolsey

Notable senior fellows 
 Ambassador Paula J. Dobriansky
 Richard Verma
 Anoka Abeyrathne
 Adnan Amin

Reception

In 2016, the Atlantic Council drew criticism from the founder of the Human Rights Foundation for its decision to award a Global Citizen Award to Ali Bongo Ondimba. Bongo declined the award amidst controversy over the 2016 Gabonese presidential election.

In July 2019, Russia said the activities of the Atlantic Council pose a threat to the foundations of its constitutional system and the security of the Russian Federation. Russia added the Atlantic Council to its list of "undesirable" organizations, preventing it from operating within Russia.

Publications
The Atlantic Council produces publications and issue briefs about global policy issues ranging from NATO's global role to energy security.

See also
Special Relationship

References

External links 
 
 Board of Directors at Atlantic Council
 Atlantic Council of the United States records, 1950-1986 at the Hoover Institution Archives.

 
Think tanks established in 1961
Foreign policy and strategy think tanks in the United States
United States–European relations
1961 establishments in Washington, D.C.
Think tanks based in Washington, D.C.
Non-profit organizations based in Washington, D.C.
501(c)(3) organizations
Criticism of journalism
Disinformation
Journalism ethics
Undesirable organizations in Russia